Pando is a city in the Canelones Department of Uruguay. It is an important commercial and industrial centre which has become part of the wider metropolitan area of Montevideo.

Pando is also the name of the municipality to which the city belongs and which includes several other small populated areas and rural areas from the limits of the Ciudad de la Costa to the south to the limits of Route 7 to the northwest.

Geography
The stream Arroyo Pando flows by the east limits of the city.

Climate
The climate in this area is characterized by hot, humid summers and generally mild to cool winters.  According to the Köppen Climate Classification system, Pando has a humid subtropical climate, abbreviated "Cfa" on climate maps.

History
Pando was founded on 13 May 1788. It took its name from one of its first inhabitants who had moved there in 1730. It was the seat of the Guardia del Pando, a force against Portuguese advances. It had acquired the status of "Pueblo" (village) before the Independence of Uruguay.

According to the Act of Ley Nº 759, on 11 March 1863 it held the status of "Villa" (town).  On 5 August 1920, its status was elevated to "Ciudad" (city) by the Act of Ley Nº 7.252. At the time, it was an industrial center and had a track for airplanes which became an airport in 1928. This airport was moved to Carrasco in 1948 and the Military Aeronautic School took its place.

In 1969, the Tupamaros took part in a violent occupation known as the Taking of Pando.

Places of worship
 Parish Church of the Immaculate Conception (Roman Catholic)

Population
According to the 2011 census, Pando had a population of 25,947. In 2010, the Intendencia de Canelones had estimated a population of 31,713  for the municipality during the elections.
 
Source: Instituto Nacional de Estadística de Uruguay

References

External links

Official site of Pando
Intendencia Municipal de Canelones
INE map of Pando, Estanque de Pando, Jardines de Pando and Viejo Molino

 
Populated places in the Canelones Department